Daniel Anthony Otero (born February 19, 1985) is an American former professional baseball pitcher. He played in Major League Baseball (MLB) for the San Francisco Giants, Oakland Athletics, and Cleveland Indians.

Amateur career
Otero went to Ransom Everglades High School in Coconut Grove, Florida. He began his college baseball career at Duke University, where he played for the Duke Blue Devils baseball team in the Atlantic Coast Conference from 2004 through 2006. Playing collegiate summer baseball in the summer of 2005, he helped the Newport Gulls win their third New England Collegiate Baseball League championship.

Otero transferred to the University of South Florida (USF), where he played his senior season with the South Florida Bulls baseball team in the Big East Conference.

Professional career

San Francisco Giants
The San Francisco Giants drafted Otero out of USF in the 21st round (644th overall) of the 2007 Major League Baseball Draft. They added him to the 40 man roster to protect him from the Rule 5 draft after the 2011 season. Otero made the club's Opening Day roster in 2012.

Otero won the 2012 Harry S. Jordan Award, which is given in recognition of the player in his first big league camp whose performance and dedication in Spring Training best exemplifies the Giants' spirit. In his major league debut, on April 7, 2012, Otero recorded his first career major league strikeout against Justin Upton.

Oakland Athletics

On March 26, 2013, Otero was claimed off waivers by the New York Yankees. The Yankees designated him for assignment the next day. Otero was then claimed off waivers by the Oakland Athletics on March 29, 2013, and immediately optioned to the Triple-A Sacramento River Cats. Otero was designated for assignment after the club acquired Stephen Vogt from the Tampa Bay Rays on April 5, 2013. He was outrighted to Sacramento on April 7.

On June 14, 2013, he was brought up from Sacramento as Hideki Okajima was optioned down. He had his first major-league win in relief of A.J. Griffin on July 2, 2013 against the Chicago Cubs. In 33 games for the A's, he was 2-0 with a 1.38 ERA in 39 innings.

For the 2014 season, Otero served as a mainstay in the A's bullpen, pitching a career high 72 games. He was 8-2 with a 2.28 ERA in  innings. On September 30, 2014, Otero was the losing pitcher in the 2014 American League Wild Card Game, giving up two earned runs in the bottom of the 12th inning. He struggled the following season, appearing in 41 games but having an ERA of 6.75 in  innings.

Cleveland Indians
On November 3, 2015, Otero was claimed off of waivers by the Philadelphia Phillies. They designated him for assignment on December 11. He was traded to the Cleveland Indians for cash considerations on December 18. In his first season with Cleveland, he rebounded from the previous season, having an ERA of 1.53 in 62 appearances. He had an ERA of 2.85 in 2017. The following season proved to be a difficult one for Otero as he registered an ERA of 5.22 in 61 appearances.

On October 29, 2018, he was selected MLB All-Stars at 2018 MLB Japan All-Star Series

On October 31, 2019, the Indians announced they had declined their club option on Otero's contract for the 2020 season, making Otero a free agent.

New York Yankees
Otero signed a minor league deal with the New York Yankees in February 2020. He became a free agent on November 2, 2020.

Post-baseball career
On March 22, 2021, it was announced that Otero was hired by the Cleveland Indians to join their baseball operations department.

Personal life
Otero and his wife, Tiffany, have three daughters.

References

External links

1985 births
Living people
American sportspeople of Cuban descent
Baseball players from Miami
Cleveland Indians players
Connecticut Defenders players
Duke Blue Devils baseball players
Fresno Grizzlies players
Major League Baseball pitchers
Nashville Sounds players
Oakland Athletics players
Richmond Flying Squirrels players
Sacramento River Cats players
Salem-Keizer Volcanoes players
San Francisco Giants players
San Jose Giants players
South Florida Bulls baseball players